Division, in horticulture and gardening, is a method of asexual plant propagation, where the plant (usually an herbaceous perennial) is broken up into two or more parts. Both the root and crown of each part is kept intact. The technique is of ancient origin, and has long been used to propagate bulbs such as garlic and saffron. plant tissue culture is also a form of division, where the meristem of the plant is divided.

Overview
Division is one of the three main methods used by gardeners to increase stocks of plants (the other two are seed-sowing and cuttings). Division is usually applied to mature perennial plants, but may also be used for shrubs with suckering roots, such as gaultheria, kerria and sarcococca. Annual and biennial plants do not lend themselves to this procedure, as their lifespan is too short.

Practice
Most perennials are best divided and replanted every few years to keep them healthy.  They may also be divided in order to produce new plants.  Those with woody crowns or fleshy roots need to be cut apart, while others can be prized apart using garden forks or hand forks.  Each separate section must have both shoots and roots. Division can take place at almost any time of the year, but the best seasons are Autumn and Spring.

See also  
 Root cutting
 Bare root

References 

Horticulture
Asexual reproduction